An outdoor bronze sculpture of Christopher Columbus by Jeronimo Suñol is installed in Central Park in Manhattan, New York.

History
In 1892, the Statue of Christopher Columbus was donated to Central Park by the New York Genealogical and Biographical Society in commemoration of the 400th anniversary of his arrival in the Americas. The statue replicates one made by Jeronimo Suñol in 1892, located at the Plaza de Colon, in Madrid. The New York version was placed in the park in 1894 at the foot of the Mall, and is today one of two monuments of Columbus found in the park's environs, the other being the statue surmounting the column at Columbus Circle.  The sculpture depicts the explorer standing with outstretched arms, looking towards the heavens in gratitude for his successful voyage. 

The statue was created to commemorate the 400th anniversary, in 1892, of Columbus's arrival in the Americas. It was unveiled in Central Park on May 12, 1894.

In August 2017, the statue was vandalized with red paint and graffiti reading "Hate will not be tolerated" and '#somethingscoming". The statue was restored shortly thereafter. The statue was vandalized again in February 2023 with red paint and graffiti reading "land back" and "murderer".

See also

 1892 in art
 Monument to Columbus (Madrid)

References

External links
 

1892 establishments in New York (state)
1892 sculptures
Bronze sculptures in Central Park
Monuments and memorials in Manhattan
Outdoor sculptures in Manhattan
Sculptures in Central Park
Sculptures of men in New York City
Statues in New York City
Central Park
Vandalized works of art in New York City
Maps in art